Amélie may refer to:

 Amélie (given name)
 Amélie, a 2001 French film 
 Amélie (soundtrack) from the film
   Amélie (musical), a musical based on the 2001 film
 Ameli.fr, official website of the French national health insurance office
 French frigate Amélie (1808), a 46-gun Pallas-class frigate of the French Navy
"Amelie", song by Mercury Rev from The Light in You
"Amelie", a 2007 song by Mr. J. Medeiros

See also
 Amelia (disambiguation)
 Amalie (disambiguation)